Euphaedra justicia, the Justicia Themis forester, is a butterfly in the family Nymphalidae. It is found in Nigeria, Cameroon, Gabon and the Democratic Republic of the Congo.

Similar species
Other members of themis species group q.v.

References

Butterflies described in 1886
justicia
Taxa named by Otto Staudinger
Butterflies of Africa